William Solomon Wade (born March 25, 1978) is an American politician from Georgia. Wade is a Republican member of Georgia House of Representatives for District 9.

References

Republican Party members of the Georgia House of Representatives
21st-century American politicians
Living people
1978 births